is a Japanese media franchise created by Sanrio in November 2015. The Sanrio Boys were conceptualized as a social media project to promote merchandise for Sanrio's best-selling characters. Due to its popularity, it grew to have its own merchandise line, a manga series, a series of character drama CDs, a 2016 smartphone game for iOS and Android, and an anime television series by Pierrot aired from January to March 2018.

Background
The Sanrio Boys were created by Sanrio in November 2015 to promote merchandise for their best-selling characters on social media, a strategy of which has been compared to Twitter accounts run by characters from Uta no Prince-sama. The Sanrio Boys originally consisted of five characters, but has since then expanded to seven. The characters were so well-received that they received their own line of character merchandise starting in June 2016.

Characters

Sanrio Boys

Kota is a fan of Pompompurin and was given a plush toy from his grandmother as a child. He is embarrassed to openly admit he likes Pompompurin until he meets Yu and Shunsuke.

Yu is Kota's outgoing classmate who is open about his love for My Melody. He is popular with his classmates for his friendly and sociable personality.

Shunsuke is the ace striker of the soccer team and a fan of Hello Kitty, who he refers to with respect. He has a serious and stoic personality.

Ryo is a shy and beautiful first year student who likes Kiki and Lala from Little Twin Stars.

Seiichiro is the president of the student council and a member of the archery team. He loves Cinnamoroll.

Subaru is a wannabe delinquent who loves Badtz-Maru. He was introduced in April 2017.

Naoki is a biology teacher who loves Keroppi. He was introduced in April 2017.

Kansai Sanrio Boys

Yumenosuke is a fan of Hello Kitty. He was first introduced as a character for Miracle Stage: Sanrio Boys at Sanrio Expo 2018.

Torao is a friend of Yumenosuke who loves Kuromi. thanks to him. He was first introduced as a character for Miracle Stage: Sanrio Boys at Sanrio Expo 2018.

Tomohiro is the president of the mandolin guitar club. He is a fan of Pochacco. He was first introduced as a character for Miracle Stage: Sanrio Boys at Sanrio Expo 2018.

Yuzu is Tomohiro's roommate/childhood friend and a fan of Kirimi. He was first introduced as a character for Miracle Stage: Sanrio Boys at Sanrio Expo 2018.

Fujita is a teacher who loves Tuxedo Sam. He was first introduced as a character for Miracle Stage: Sanrio Boys at Sanrio Expo 2018.

Secondary characters

Yuri is Yū's younger sister and is in middle school. She has a strained relationship with him, and disapproves of him liking My Melody.

Media

Manga
Sanrio Boys was adapted into two manga adaptations written and illustrated by Mai Ando, with both manga series running concurrently. , which features the Sanrio Boys' daily lives, was published on the mobile app MangaONE starting April 2016. , which features one of the Sanrio Boys being romantically involved with a girl, was serialized in the magazine Sho-Comi starting from its June 2016 issue. Both were compiled into volume format and released under the title Sanrio Boys under Shogakukan's Flower Comics imprint.

Game
A visual novel style dating sim game was released onto Android and iOS under the name  on September 13, 2016. The theme song is "Fun! Fantastic Girl", produced by Elements Garden and performed by the voice actors of Sanrio Boys. Approximately 100,000 users downloaded the game during the first six days of release.

Anime
An anime adaptation of Sanrio Boys was announced in the fifth issue of the 2017 edition of Shogakukan's Sho-Comi magazine. The series is directed by Masashi Kudō and written by Takashi Aoshima, and the anime production is handled by Pierrot. The anime aired Japan from January 6 to March 24, 2018. The series is licensed by Ponycan USA in North America, who are simulcasting the series on Crunchyroll. The anime has 12 episodes.

Stage play

A stage play titled Miracle☆Stage Sanrio Boys was announced at the end of episode 12 of the anime. The play is directed by Masami Itō, with the script written by Shinjirō Kameda, the choreography by Tetsuharu, and the music composed by Yu. The main cast consists of Naoya Kitagawa as Kōta, Hiroki Sasamori as Yū, Tsubasa Yoshizawa as Shunsuke, Yū Miyazaki as Ryō, Shinichi Wagō as Seiichiro, Kōhei Kishi as Subaru Amagaya, and Jin Hiramaki as Naoki.
 Five new characters created exclusively for the play were revealed at Sanrio Expo 2018. The play ran from November 29 to December 9, 2018, at The Galaxy Theatre in Tokyo. The final show on December 9 was live streamed on Niconico to Japanese residents. Pompompurin, My Melody, and Hello Kitty made guest appearances at alternating shows.

Reception
As of April 5, 2018 the manga had 200,000 copies in print.

Rebecca Silverman of Anime News Network gave the anime series a mixed review, mentioning that while the first half of the series was well-written, the second half of the series "took a nosedive" and felt like an "overt advertisement."

References

External links
Official website 
Official website (game) 
Official website (anime) 

Comedy anime and manga
Crunchyroll anime
Mass media franchises
Pierrot (company)
Sanrio
Shogakukan manga
Shōjo manga
Slice of life anime and manga